Metetí  is a town and corregimiento in Pinogana District, Darién Province, Panama with a population of 7,976 as of 2010. It was created by Law 58 of July 29, 1998, owing to the Declaration of Unconstitutionality of Law 1 of 1982. Its population as of 2000 was 6,244. It is the last major town on the Inter-American Highway before the highway ends at Yaviza. Most of the town's residents are originally from Chiriquí Province. The town has a bank with an ATM, a few restaurants and hotels, a police station, and a gas station.

References

Corregimientos of Darién Province
Populated places in Darién Province